Kerguelenella innominata is a species of air-breathing sea snail, a false limpet, a marine pulmonate gastropod mollusc in the family Siphonariidae, the false limpets.

References
 Powell A. W. B., New Zealand Mollusca, William Collins Publishers Ltd, Auckland, New Zealand 1979 

Siphonariidae
Gastropods of New Zealand
Gastropods described in 1915